Sergejs Tarasovs (born 16 January 1971) is a retired Latvian football midfielder.

References

1971 births
Living people
Latvian footballers
Skonto FC players
Tallinna JK players
Dinaburg FC players
FC Neftekhimik Nizhnekamsk players
Association football midfielders
Latvian expatriate footballers
Expatriate footballers in Estonia
Latvian expatriate sportspeople in Estonia
Expatriate footballers in Russia
Latvian expatriate sportspeople in Russia
Latvia international footballers